Staffan is a Swedish form of Stephen, attested since 1330. It may refer to:

Staffan Anger (born 1943), Swedish politician of the Moderate Party
Staffan Appelros (born 1950), Swedish politician of the Moderate Party
Staffan Danielsson (born 1947), Swedish Centre Party politician, member of the Riksdag since 2004
Staffan de Mistura (born 1947), long-serving Italian-Swedish diplomat
Staffan Götestam (born 1952), Swedish actor and director
Staffan Göthe (born 1944), Swedish playwright, actor, and director
Staffan Kihlbom (born 1962), Swedish actor, who appeared in the 2000 film The Beach
Staffan Kronwall (born 1983), professional ice hockey defenceman
Staffan Olsson (born 1964), retired Swedish handball player and Swedish national coach
Staffan Skott (born 1943), Swedish journalist, author and translator
Staffan Strand (born 1976), Swedish former high jumper
Staffan Tällberg (born 1970), Swedish former ski jumper
Staffan Tapper (born 1948), former footballer from Sweden
Staffan Tunis (born 1982), Finnish ski-orienteering competitor
Staffan Valdemar Holm (born 1958), Swedish theatre director
, Swedish 11th-century apostle due to whom the name is associated with Hälsingland

See also
Staffan Sasses Gränd (Swedish: Alley of Staffan Sasse), a blind alley in Gamla stan, the old town in central Stockholm, Sweden
Staffa, island off the west coast of Scotland
Staffin, village on the island of Skye, Scotland

References 

Swedish masculine given names